The Dud Perkins Lifetime Achievement Award was established by the American Motorcyclist Association in January 1970. Among several AMA awards established for "significant contributions to American motorcycling", the Dud Perkins Award holds the top honor for "the highest level of service" to motorcyclists. It is named for the first awardee, Motorcycle Hall of Fame inductee Dudley "Dud" Perkins.

2016: Craig Vetter
2014: Mike and Margaret Wilson
2013: Andy Goldfine
2012: Jerry Abboud
2004: Dave Despain
2002: Patty Mills
2000: Jim Hutzler and Carl Reynolds
1998: Jim Nickerson
1997: Trevor Deeley
1996: Woody Leone Sr. and Bill Boyce
1995: Dick Mann
1994: Dave & Rita Coombs and Mike Farabaugh
1993: Charlie & Joan Watson and Chuck & Sharon Clayton
1991: Bob Frink
1990: Roger Hull, Harold Farnam & Roxy Rockwood
1989: Stan & Dorothy Miles
1988: Joe Christian
1987: Bee Gee & Duke Pennell and John & Bonnie Burnside
1986: Hap Jones and Floyd "Pop" Dreyer
1985: Bill Bagnall
1984: Jim Davis
1983: J. C. "Pappy" Hoel & Earl & Lucille Flanders
1982: Al Eames
1981: Lin Kuchler
1980: Horace Fritz
1979: Earl and Dot Robinson
1978: Reggie Pink
1977: J. R. Kelley
1976: John Harley
1975: Bruce Walters
1973: William S. Harley
1972: Tom Sifton
1971: Soichiro Honda
1970: Dudley "Dud" Perkins

References

American Motorcyclist Association
Dud Perkins Award winners